Daniel H. Daneshvar (born March 2, 1983) is an American neuroscientist, brain injury physician, and physiatrist. He is known for his academic work in traumatic brain injury and the long-term consequences of repetitive head impacts, including chronic traumatic encephalopathy (CTE). He also founded Team Up Against Concussions, the first scientifically validated concussion education program for children. He is the Director of the Institute for Brain Research and Innovation at TeachAids, which created CrashCourse, a virtual-reality or video based concussion education program.

Early life and education
Daneshvar grew up in Detroit, Michigan and attended Detroit Country Day School. He received his S.B. in Brain and Cognitive Sciences from MIT. He received his M.D. and Ph.D. dual degrees from Boston University School of Medicine. His work at the Boston University CTE Center and Brain Bank resulted in the first dissertation in history to study CTE. He completed his physical medicine and rehabilitation residency at the Stanford University School of Medicine.

Career
Daneshvar is a brain injury physician in the Department of Physical Medicine and Rehabilitation at Spaulding Rehabilitation Hospital, Harvard Medical School in Boston, Massachusetts. His research focuses on identifying and characterizing the relationship between exposure to repetitive head impacts, and its effect on the development of neurodegenerative disease. In addition, he studies the incidence and prevalence of CTE in high risk populations. Daneshvar's work has been published in the Journal of the American Medical Association, Annals of Neurology, and Neurology, and has received coverage from news organizations. As Director of the TeachAids Institute for Brain Research and Innovation, he also focuses on improving concussion education by using novel technology to attempt to change the culture around concussion reporting.

Awards
In 2016, Daneshvar received the Excellence in Public Health Award from the United States Public Health Service
In 2021, Daneshvar received the Dean's Community Service Award from Harvard Medical School

References

External links
Massachusetts General Hospital profile
Google Scholar profile

Living people
People from Detroit
Harvard Medical School faculty
American physicians
American medical researchers
Concussion activists
Detroit Country Day School alumni
Boston University School of Medicine alumni
Massachusetts Institute of Technology alumni
1983 births